Delmer John Young (October 24, 1885 – December 17, 1959) was a professional baseball player. He played all or part of three seasons in Major League Baseball, primarily as an outfielder. In 1909, he played for the Cincinnati Reds, and in 1914 and 1915 for the Buffalo Blues. During his playing career, he was measured at 5 foot 11, and batted left-handed and threw right-handed. He was born in Macon, Missouri on October 24, 1885. His son, Delmer Edward Young also played Major League Baseball.

In 94 career major league games, he had 52 hits, 4 home runs, 23 runs batted in, and 17 runs. He had a career batting average of .265. 

Young died on December 17, 1959, in Cleveland, Ohio.

External links

Cincinnati Reds players
Buffalo Buffeds players
Buffalo Blues players
Youngstown Indians players
Fort Wayne Billikens players
Fort Wayne Brakies players
Nashville Vols players
Springfield Tips players
Baseball players from Missouri
1885 births
1959 deaths
People from Macon, Missouri
Bradford Drillers players